Özkan Karabulut (born 16 January 1991) is a Turkish professional footballer who currently plays as a goalkeeper for Etimesgut Belediyespor. Özkan made his professional debut for Gençlerbirliği against Gaziantepspor at Gaziantep Kamil Ocak Stadium on 8 May 2010.

References

External links
 Profile at TFF.org
 
 Özkan Karabulut at Soccerway

1991 births
Living people
People from Mamak, Ankara
Turkish footballers
Turkey B international footballers
Turkey under-21 international footballers
Turkey youth international footballers
Süper Lig players
TFF First League players
TFF Second League players
Gençlerbirliği S.K. footballers
Ankaraspor footballers
Boluspor footballers
Ankara Keçiörengücü S.K. footballers
Kahramanmaraşspor footballers
Association football goalkeepers